Rud Zard-e Mashin (also Romanized as Rūd Zard-e Māshīn and Rūd-e Zard Māshīn; also known as Rūd Zard and Rūd Zard-e Sādāt) is a village in Howmeh-ye Sharqi Rural District, in the Central District of Haftkel County, Khuzestan Province, Iran. At the 2006 census, its population was 2,625, in 533 families.

References 

Populated places in Ramhormoz County